Carlo Valli (born 4 October 1943) is an Italian actor and voice actor who is best known as the official dubbing voice for Robin Williams.

Biography
Born in Asti, Valli studied at the Silvio D'Amico National Academy of Dramatic Arts and then began performing at the Teatro Stabile d'Abruzzo. He later became well known to the Italian public as a voice actor and dubber and he is the official Italian voice dubbing actor of Robin Williams. He is also renowned for dubbing Jim Broadbent, Colm Meaney, Richard Dreyfuss, Ken Stott, Martin Sheen, John Heard, Robert Duvall and Richard Jenkins in some of their movies. Some of the Italian dubbing roles that Valli is best known for includes Ghostface from the Scream film series and Horace Slughorn from the Harry Potter franchise.

In Valli’s Italian dubbed animated roles, he voiced Rex in the Toy Story film series, Gobber the Belch in the How to Train Your Dragon franchise and Pops in The Secret Life of Pets franchise.

As an actor, Valli had key roles on stage and television. In the 1970s, he was in the science fiction-drama miniseries Gamma as well as the detective fiction show La donna di picche.

Personal life
Valli was once married to actress Claudia Giannotti. He is now married to voice actress Cristina Giachero. In 1998, Valli became a father for the first time at the age of 54 to voice actor Ruggero Valli. In 2000 he had another son, Arturo, who is also a voice actor.

Dubbing roles

Animation
Rex in Toy Story
Rex in Toy Story 2
Rex in Toy Story 3
Rex in Toy Story 4
Rex in Toy Story of Terror!
Rex in Toy Story That Time Forgot
Rex in Hawaiian Vacation
Rex in Small Fry
Rex in Partysaurus Rex
Rex in Monsters, Inc.
Commander Nebula / Rex in Buzz Lightyear of Star Command: The Adventure Begins
Commander Nebula in Buzz Lightyear of Star Command
Pops in The Secret Life of Pets
Pops in The Secret Life of Pets 2
Gobber the Belch in How to Train Your Dragon
Gobber the Belch in How to Train Your Dragon 2
Gobber the Belch in How to Train Your Dragon: The Hidden World
Gobber the Belch in DreamWorks Dragons
Charlie in Finding Dory
Fender in Robots
Principal Stickler in Teacher's Pet
Gaëtan "Mole" Molière in Atlantis: Milo's Return
Jacob Marley in A Christmas Carol
Shifu in Kung Fu Panda: Legends of Awesomeness
Narrator in Hey Duggee
Narrator in Horton Hears a Who!
Station in Lloyd in Space
Ernie Clicker in Arthur Christmas
Baron Von Steamer in Big Hero 6: The Series
Mr. Robbins in Ozzy
Dorgle in Smallfoot
Mr. Brown in Postman Pat: The Movie
Oogway in Kung Fu Panda: The Paws of Destiny
Scrubby in Robinson Crusoe
Narrator in Pom Poko
Bamboo Cutter in The Tale of the Princess Kaguya
Lars in ChalkZone

Live action
Daniel Hillard / Euphegenia Doubtfire in Mrs. Doubtfire
Adrian Cronauer in Good Morning, Vietnam
Hunter "Patch" Adams in Patch Adams
Jack Powell in Jack
Professor Philip Brainard in Flubber
Sean Maguire in Good Will Hunting
John Keating in Dead Poets Society
Bob Munro in RV
Seymour "Sy" Parrish in One Hour Photo
Leslie Zevo in Toys
Chris Nielsen in What Dreams May Come
Walter Finch in Insomnia
Lance Clayton in World's Greatest Dad
Hector in Being Human
Maxwell "Wizard" Wallace in August Rush
Jack Dundee in The Best of Times
Joey O'Brien in Cadillac Man
Dr. Cozy Carlisle in Dead Again
Dr. Kosevich in Nine Months
John Jacob Jingleheimer Schmidt in To Wong Foo, Thanks for Everything! Julie Newmar
Armand Goldman in The Birdcage
The Professor in The Secret Agent
Osric in Hamlet
Mel in Deconstructing Harry
Charlie Boyd in Noel
Alan Hakman in The Final Cut
Paul Barnell in The Big White
Tom Dobbs in Man of the Year
Reverend Frank Dorman in License to Wed
Dan Rayburn in Old Dogs
Dwight D. Eisenhower in The Butler
Father Bill Moinighan in The Big Wedding
Roger in The Face of Love
Henry Altmann in The Angriest Man in Brooklyn
Mitch Mitchler in A Merry Friggin' Christmas
Dennis the Dog in Absolutely Anything
Horace Slughorn in Harry Potter and the Half-Blood Prince
Horace Slughorn in Harry Potter and the Deathly Hallows – Part 2
Samuel Gruber in Paddington
Samuel Gruber in Paddington 2
Col in The Crying Game
Tom Hepple in Another Year
Denis Thatcher in The Iron Lady
Captain Molyneux / Vyvyan Ayrs / Timothy Cavendish in Cloud Atlas
Nick Burrows in Le Week-End
Fred Herbert in Big Game
Santa Claus in Get Santa
Underwood in The Lady in the Van
Prime Minister in The Legend of Tarzan
Tony Webster in The Sense of an Ending
Thomas "Doc" Durant in Hell on Wheels
Dessie Curley in The Snapper
Larry in The Van
Duncan Malloy in Con Air
Jerry Lynch in Intermission
Gavin in Five Fingers
Don Revie in The Damned United
Detective Dunnigan in Law Abiding Citizen
Jonathan Snow in Get Him to the Greek
CIA Agent in The Cold Light of Day
Roland Potts in One Chance
Balin in The Hobbit: An Unexpected Journey
Balin in The Hobbit: The Desolation of Smaug
Balin in The Hobbit: The Battle of the Five Armies
Trufflehunter in The Chronicles of Narnia: Prince Caspian
Steven Mayhew in One Day
Stanley Best in The Mercy
Colonel Picquart in Prisoner of Honor
Chris Leece in Another Stakeout
Irv Gideon in My Life in Ruins
Buddy Green in The Last Laugh
George in Book Club
Earl Huttinger in Rumor Has It
Mr. Tyree in Dear John
Richard in Eat Pray Love
Driver in Killing Them Softly
Jed Lewis in The Company You Keep
Peter McCallister in Home Alone
Peter McCallister in Home Alone 2: Lost in New York
Mitch Kellaway in The Mask
Delbert McGinty in We Bought a Zoo
Lou Levov in American Pastoral
Ghostface in Scream
Ghostface in Scream 2
Ghostface in Scream 3
Ghostface in Scream 4
James Harvey in Casper
Fred Madison in Lost Highway
Andy Safian in Malice
Sonny Dewey in The Apostle
Ely in The Road
Scott Briggs in Wild Horses
Tom Mulligan in Widows
Snake Plissken in Escape from New York
Jack Burton in Big Trouble in Little China
Michael Carr in Unlawful Entry
Terek Murad in The Jackal
Pavel in The Boy in the Striped Pyjamas
Lennox in Macbeth
Ewart in Viceroy's House
Ted in Finding Your Feet
Oliver Thompson in Mesmerized
Lamar Blackburn in The Accountant
Don Whitaker in Daddy's Home 2
Crowley in Stay Tuned
Mr. Habib in Father of the Bride Part II
Max Yasgur in Taking Woodstock
Walder Frey in Game of Thrones
Arthur Jeffries / Professor Proton in The Big Bang Theory
Arthur Jeffries / Professor Proton in Young Sheldon
Al Angel in Angels in the Outfield
Uncle Martin / The Martian in My Favorite Martian
Kroenig in Sin City: A Dame to Kill For
Howard Payne in Speed
Rusty James’ father in Rumble Fish
Feck in River's Edge
Rizzo in The Sentinel
Roger Barlow in The Maiden Heist
Robert Plath in This Must Be the Place
Lucky in Lucky
Seal and Signet Minister in Jupiter Ascending
H. Clifford McBride in Ad Astra
Sam Harris in Last Vegas
Tooth Fairy in The Santa Clause 2
Harry Ellis / James in Die Hard
Max Belfort in The Wolf of Wall Street
Sherlock Holmes in Mr. Holmes
Murad Hoxha in Taken 2
Maury in Mouse Hunt

Video games
Mímir in God of War

References

External links

1943 births
Living people
People from Asti
Italian male voice actors
Italian male stage actors
Italian male television actors
Italian male film actors
Italian male radio actors
Italian male video game actors
Italian voice directors
20th-century Italian male actors
21st-century Italian male actors
Accademia Nazionale di Arte Drammatica Silvio D'Amico alumni